Ernie "Kiwi" Kingston (1914-1992) was a 6' 5" wrestler and film actor from New Zealand, relatively unknown, but still remembered for his role as the Karloff-like Frankenstein's monster in Hammer's The Evil of Frankenstein (1964). He also appeared in the film Hysteria (1965).

Filmography

References

External links
 
 The Forgotten Kiwis - Big Stars In Europe, Unknown In Their Own Country

New Zealand male professional wrestlers
New Zealand male film actors
1992 deaths
1914 births